Aclıqbinə (also, Ajlygbina) is a village in the Balakan District of Azerbaijan. The village forms part of the municipality of Gullar.

References 

Populated places in Balakan District